Garfield's Fun Fest is a 2008 computer-animated comedy film based on the comic strip Garfield. It was produced by Paws, Inc., in cooperation with The Animation Picture Company and distributed by 20th Century Fox Home Entertainment. It was written by Garfield's creator Jim Davis as a sequel to Garfield Gets Real. The film was released on August 5, 2008. It was later followed by a third film, Garfield's Pet Force, in 2009.

Plot
Garfield is reading a book about the origins of Freddy Frog, his pond, and the beginning of humor to Odie. At breakfast, Jon reminds Garfield that Arlene wants to do a dance with him this year for the Annual Fun Fest, but Garfield is not interested in changing his 29-year comedy routine, nor is he worried about losing, and believes he will win again, because he won the Fun Fest 29 times, and the 30th Annual Fun Fest is to come tomorrow night. Arlene finds a different dance partner, Ramone; a heartbroken Garfield leaves alone. Garfield attempts to perform a new act that is done by himself, but he bombs it due to Ramone's heckling, and his ego is deflated. Worse, Arlene and Ramone seem enamored.

At the studio's cafeteria, Odie gives Garfield a letter. When the duo opens it, they see that it's a map that leads to Freddie Frog's (from the opening scene) pond; Garfield plans to travel to the pond and drink the water in order to be funny and win the show, hoping to impress Arlene. Arlene watches him leave and realizes she has hurt Garfield's feelings. She then runs outside of the studio, but Garfield and Odie are already gone. Garfield and Odie follow the map and eventually, seemingly, make it to the pond after many obstacles and encountering the funny animals who have drunk from the pond. There, an oversized frog - Freddy - tells them that is not the pond they are looking for. Freddy agrees and leads them onto many trials that involve learning how to truly be funny. But Garfield fails to understand what the trials were about. They continue to the Funny Pond, with Garfield learning about self-deprecating humor. Meanwhile, Fun Fest director Charles worries, as Garfield was the main focus for Fun Fest and is missing. Ramone steps in and takes his place. While Arlene is disappointed that Garfield was gone and worried that he is jealous and hurt, Ramone manages to win over the audience and judges with his quips and accent.

Back in the forest, Garfield attains the pond, drinks from it, and begins to feel funny. Garfield dances around and moves playfully until he remembers Fun Fest. Garfield takes some pond water in a bottle, and Freddy gives Garfield and Odie a hang glider; they soar over the forest, thanking the animals that helped them along the way. They crash land at the Fun Fest just in time for Garfield's scheduled slot. Garfield prepares to drink the Funny Water he stored, but the bottle had been destroyed in the crash landing, and all the water is now gone. Feeling that he has lost his funny forever, Garfield gives up and leaves. From behind a curtain, Garfield watches Arlene and Ramone dance and slinks off heartbroken. Arlene and Ramone spot him as he leaves. Arlene tries to get to him, but she is pulled back by Ramone and back into dancing. Freddy shows up and tells Garfield that the funny water was just plain water and it was never the funny water that made him funny, but rather himself that was funny, because of what he has done over his adventure, and that this should not even be about being funny.  Freddy encourages Garfield to follow his heart by telling him this will be the only chance to prove himself. Knowing that Freddy's right, Garfield regains his hope. Determined to set things right with Arlene, Garfield goes back to the stage.

Arlene meets Garfield on stage, and they dance. Not wanting to be upstaged, Ramone confronts Garfield and the two cats fight. In the process, Garfield rips off Ramone's clothing, revealing Ramone to be a robot. Using one of Ramone’s robotic arms, Garfield rips off the legs and robot face, revealing it to be Nermal in a robot suit, much to Garfield and Arlene's anger and to the shock of the crowd and judges. As the crowd cheers for Garfield's performance, they boo Nermal and force him to shamefully get off the stage, disqualifying him. Garfield and Arlene share an encore and Garfield apologizes to Arlene for not even trying to dance with Arlene, as this was more important than winning. However, the two win cheers from everyone and win the contest by getting the first perfect score in Fun Fest history. Garfield and Arlene are crowned winners of Fun Fest while Nermal starts thinking of other ideas for next year's Fun Fest much to Odie's disbelief.

Cast
 Frank Welker - Garfield, Jeff, Leonard, Delivery Gnome, Prop Boy
 Tim Conway - Freddy Frog, Gate Guard, Roger, Narrator
 Gregg Berger - Odie, Shecky
 Jennifer Darling - Bonita Stegman, Betty, Bonnie Bear
 Greg Eagles - Eli
 Jason Marsden - Nermal/Ramone
 Neil Ross - Walter "Wally" Stegman, Charles
 Stephen Stanton - Randy Rabbit, Stanislavsky
 Fred Tatasciore - Billy Bear, Junior Bear
 Audrey Wasilewski - Arlene, Momma Bear, Zelda
 Wally Wingert - Jon Arbuckle
 Maddie Blaustein - Alligators (uncredited)

Release
Garfield's Fun Fest was released on DVD on August 5, 2008, by 20th Century Fox Home Entertainment.

Analysis
Alhough Paul Mavis described the film as lacking comedic excellence and the film garnered no important accolades, it does contain serious literary elements: the meta-story (the film opens with one of the characters reading a story; a character from that story later appears in the main exposition, and is ultimately revealed to be the narrator of the entire film, itself merely a story), metatheatrical overtones reminiscent of the work of Luigi Pirandello and others (the characters inhabit a comic strip and are aware of it), and the quest motif (the protagonist, Garfield, must travel through strange lands, overcome various obstacles, and achieve transformative wisdom to attain his goal).

Box office
The film opened in nine countries. Its most profitable market was Brazil, where the film generated $729,560 in revenue and opened at sixth place with $219,801. The film had a 2013 re-release in Portugal, and opened to $9,048, finishing eighth at the box office. The film dropped to 14th and 19th in its second and third weekends and finished with $21,705.

Critical response
Paul Mavis of DVD Talk said in his review: "Maybe the problem is that Garfield creator Jim Davis, who wrote this movie, can't translate his humor into an 80 minute film. What's funny in a three-panel strip becomes drawn out and forced in a feature-length film. The obvious video-game structuring of the scenes is to be expected, I guess, in these days of rampant, voracious synergy, but that doesn't make the film any more palatable. Maybe somebody else should be brought in to write these straight-to-DVD toons? It doesn't help, either, that the voice work here is somewhat muted. Legendary Frank Welker as Garfield doesn't seem all that inspired this time around (true, he's working with a character who's supposed to be ticked off and monotone, but Welker doesn't seem to find any fun here). And unfortunately, Tim Conway basically phones in his turn as Freddy Frog (even that character's name shows Davis' tired approach to the material - Freddy? Really? That's the funniest or most memorable name you could come up with?). I'm a fan of Conway's, but there's very little here to recommend in his rote performance."

Video game
A Nintendo DS game that is based on the film was released on July 29, 2008. It was developed by Black Lantern Studios and published by DSI Games in North America and Zoo Digital Publishing in Europe.

Sequel
Following the success of Fun Fest, a sequel to the film, titled Garfield's Pet Force,  was released on June 16, 2009. It is the final instalment in a trilogy of computer animation Garfield films, including Fun Fest and Garfield Gets Real.

References

External links
 
 

2008 films
2000s English-language films
American computer-animated films
Garfield films
Films with screenplays by Jim Davis (cartoonist)
Direct-to-video animated films
20th Century Fox animated films
Davis Entertainment films
Direct-to-video sequel films
20th Century Fox direct-to-video films
2000s American animated films
Animated films directed by Mark A.Z. Dippé
Animated films based on comics
American children's animated comedy films
American children's animated fantasy films
Animated films about cats